Biyahe ni Drew (International title: Drew's Travel Adventure / ) is a Philippine television travel documentary show broadcast by GMA News TV and GTV. Hosted by Drew Arellano, it premiered on GMA News TV on February 1, 2013. In February 2021, GMA News TV was rebranded as GTV, with the show being carried over.

The series is streaming online on YouTube.

Premise
Drew Arellano shows viewers that with a limited budget, people could have a vacation in the Philippines and abroad for a couple of days.

Production
The production was halted in March 2020 due to the enhanced community quarantine in Luzon caused by the COVID-19 pandemic. The show resumed its programming on November 13, 2020.

Accolades

References

External links 
 
 

2013 Philippine television series debuts
Filipino-language television shows
GMA Integrated News and Public Affairs shows
GMA News TV original programming
GTV (Philippine TV network) original programming
Philippine documentary television series
Philippine travel television series
Television productions suspended due to the COVID-19 pandemic